In geometry, the truncated order-4 octagonal tiling is a uniform tiling of the hyperbolic plane. It has Schläfli symbol of t0,1{8,4}.  A secondary construction t0,1,2{8,8} is called a truncated octaoctagonal tiling with two colors of hexakaidecagons.

Constructions 
There are two uniform constructions of this tiling, first by the [8,4] kaleidoscope, and second by removing the last mirror, [8,4,1+], gives [8,8], (*882).

Dual tiling

Symmetry

The dual of the tiling represents the fundamental domains of (*882) orbifold symmetry. From [8,8] symmetry, there are 15 small index subgroup by mirror removal and alternation operators. Mirrors can be removed if its branch orders are all even, and cuts neighboring branch orders in half. Removing two mirrors leaves a half-order gyration point where the removed mirrors met. In these images unique mirrors are colored red, green, and blue, and alternatively colored triangles show the location of gyration points. The [8+,8+], (44×) subgroup has narrow lines representing glide reflections. The subgroup index-8 group, [1+,8,1+,8,1+] (4444) is the commutator subgroup of [8,8].

One larger subgroup is constructed as [8,8*], removing the gyration points of (8*4), index 16 becomes (*44444444), and its direct subgroup [8,8*]+, index 32, (44444444).

The [8,8] symmetry can be doubled by a mirror bisecting the fundamental domain, and creating *884 symmetry.

Related polyhedra and tiling

References
 John H. Conway, Heidi Burgiel, Chaim Goodman-Strass, The Symmetries of Things 2008,  (Chapter 19, The Hyperbolic Archimedean Tessellations)

See also

Square tiling
Tilings of regular polygons
List of uniform planar tilings
List of regular polytopes

External links 

 Hyperbolic and Spherical Tiling Gallery
 KaleidoTile 3: Educational software to create spherical, planar and hyperbolic tilings
 Hyperbolic Planar Tessellations, Don Hatch

Hyperbolic tilings
Isogonal tilings
Order-4 tilings
Truncated tilings
Uniform tilings
Octagonal tilings